The 2025 ICC Champions Trophy will be the ninth ICC Champions Trophy, a One Day International cricket tournament that is set to be hosted by Pakistan.

Background
In 2016, the ICC had announced that the Champions Trophy would be canceled after the 2017 tournament. The ICC aimed to have one tournament for each of the three formats of international cricket. However, in November 2021, the ICC announced that the tournament would return in 2025. This will be first global tournament that Pakistan will host since the 2009 attack on the Sri Lanka national cricket team. The last major tournament to take place in Pakistan was in 1996 when they co-hosted the World Cup along with India and Sri Lanka. Ramiz Raja the Former chairman of Pakistan Cricket Board has expressed interest in getting a piece of land in Islamabad for a proposed cricket stadium with the aim of the stadium being ready by the tournament.

Group Stage

Knockout Stage

Semi-finals

Final

References

ICC Champions Trophy tournaments
International cricket competitions in Pakistan